Étienne Périer may refer to:
 Étienne Perier (governor), governor of the Louisiana colony
 Étienne Périer (director) (born 1931), Belgian film director